Petalostegidae is a family of bryozoans belonging to the order Cheilostomatida.

Genera:
 Chelidozoum Stach, 1935
 Petalostegus Levinsen, 1909

References

Cheilostomatida